Internationella kunskapsgymnasiet (International College) is an independent gymnasium (upper secondary school) in Liljeholmen in Stockholm, Sweden. The school is bilingual, with a mixture of Swedish and English used depending on the course.
It was established in 1998 as Internationella gymnasiet with approximately 370 students. It has an international profile and gives students several options for international trips every year.

In the summer of 2006, the school was sold to the company Kunskapsgymnasiet, thereby becoming Internationella Kunskapsgymansiet.

In the autumn of 2007, the school switched premises.

External links
Official website

Educational institutions established in 1998
Gymnasiums (school) in Sweden
1998 establishments in Sweden